"Hey Leonardo (She Likes Me for Me)" is a song by American alternative rock group Blessid Union of Souls from their third album, Walking Off the Buzz (1999). It is one of the band's most popular songs, reaching number 33 on the US Billboard Hot 100 and becoming a top-20 hit in Australia, Canada, and Iceland.

Composition
The upbeat modern rock anthem was written by band members Eliot Sloan and Jeff Pence as well as collaborator/producer Emosia. The song describes how a man knows his girlfriend likes him regardless of his possessions, social status, and physical traits.

The song references celebrities Leonardo DiCaprio, Tyson Beckford, Robert Redford, Luciano Pavarotti, Cindy Crawford, the character of Dirty Harry, and the performances of Steve Buscemi in Fargo and Jim Carrey in The Cable Guy.

Music video
The music video was directed by Geoff Moore and produced by Barry Fink. It was released on June 25, 1999.

Track listings
 UK CD single
 "Hey Leonardo (She Likes Me for Me)"  – 3:24
 "Hey Leonardo (She Likes Me for Me)" (live) – 3:57

 Australian CD and European maxi-CD single
 "Hey Leonardo (She Likes Me for Me)"  – 3:24
 "South Hampton Avenue"  – 4:05
 "Hey Leonardo (She Likes Me for Me)" (live) – 3:57

Charts

Weekly charts

Year-end charts

Certifications

References

1999 singles
1999 songs
Blessid Union of Souls songs
Leonardo DiCaprio
V2 Records singles